WHFE-LP and WVGO-LP were low-power television stations in Sullivan, Indiana, broadcasting locally as affiliates of America One on channels 18 and 54 (respectively). The stations were owned by low-power magnate KM Communications, and served different neighborhoods within Sullivan — WHFE serving the northern and central sides of Sullivan, and WVGO serving unincorporated area to the northwest of Sullivan. Two additional LPTV translators, WIIB-LP channel 7 in Farmersburg and WKMF-LP channel 32 in Sullivan, relayed the signals of WHFE and WVGO.

The stations had plans to vastly-increase their coverage area — WHFE had separate application and construction permits that would increase its power to 25 kW and move the transmitter closer to Terre Haute, to cover that city; while WVGO was to increase to 150 kW, broadcasting  from near the banks of the Wabash River, using a directional antenna that would transmit a "bow-tie" lobe towards Sullivan and Marshall, Illinois.

Although WIIB-LP and WKMF-LP simulcast the same programming as WHFE-LP and WVGO-LP, hourly station IDs displayed only the call letters and channel assignments of WHFE and WVGO.

Through early 2007, all four stations broadcast programming 24/7 from America One. That year, programming was changed to White Springs Television, which carried commercial-free movies and short subjects, most of which are in the public domain. The stations returned to America One after WSTV folded in late 2009.

All four stations left the air April 30, 2012 due to financial problems. However, WVGO-LP was supposed to have ceased operations on December 31, 2011, as channel 54 was removed from the television bandplan; its license was canceled by the Federal Communications Commission (FCC) on February 20, 2013.  The other three stations were deleted by the FCC on June 19, 2013, for failure to broadcast for a year.

References

Sullivan County, Indiana
Television stations in Indiana
Television channels and stations established in 1989
Television channels and stations disestablished in 2012
Defunct television stations in the United States
1989 establishments in Indiana
2012 disestablishments in Indiana
HFE-LP